Tommy Kennedy was an Australian professional rugby league footballer who played in the 1920s.  He played for Balmain as a winger.

Playing career
Kennedy made his debut for Balmain against St. George in 1923, scoring a try in the 23–3 victory. The following year, Kennedy played on the wing in Balmain's 3-0 grand final victory over South Sydney.  

Kennedy finished the season with 10 tries in 8 games. He played a further two seasons before retiring at the end of 1926.

References

Balmain Tigers players
Australian rugby league players
Rugby league players from Sydney
Rugby league wingers